The Wright StreetCar is an articulated bus developed by Wrightbus and Volvo for FirstGroup. It was built on the Volvo B7LA chassis, featuring a separate driver compartment at the front, resembling to some extent similar designs in Europe.

It features wrap-around seating arrangement at the rear. They were designed to mimic trams and used on FirstGroup's FTR services with high frequencies and dedicated stops to further enforce the impression of a premium service.

Operations

United Kingdom 
The StreetCar's only UK customer is First Bus, where they were introduced on First York's route 4 between Acomb and the University of York on 8 May 2006, after the City of York Council had made significant alterations to the road layout to accommodate the new vehicles. Further examples entered service with First Leeds, on First Capital Connect's Luton Airport Parkway railway station to Luton Airport shuttle and with First Cymru in Swansea.

York's StreetCars were withdrawn in 2012, following the end of a five-year contract which the city council refused to renew. These StreetCars were transferred over to Leeds to operate on the Leeds-Bradford bus corridor, but StreetCars there were later withdrawn in 2016. Swansea's StreetCars, which caused major road layout changes around the city centre to fit the buses, of which would later be blamed as a cause for two fatal accidents, were withdrawn in 2015 due to them proving too expensive to run.

United States 
In 2008/09, 50 StreetCar Rapid Transit Vehicles were built for Regional Transportation Commission of Southern Nevada in the United States for use on the RTC Transit. Developed from the Wright StreetCar, they were built on Carrosserie Hess chassis. They first arrived in December 2008.

Gallery

See also
Autonomous Rail Rapid Transit

References

External links

Wrightbus product description of Volvo B9LA model
Wrightbus product description of Hybrid model

Articulated buses
Vehicles introduced in 2006
StreetCar